Waldemar Maximilian Nestor (12 December 1888 – 27 July 1941) was the first Roman Catholic priest known to have been murdered in World War II in Yugoslavia. 

The Holy See started the process of beatification on 21 December 2014 of Nestor and three other priests of the Diocese of Banja Luka who were murdered during the Second World War, Juraj Gospodnetić, Antun Dujlović and Krešimir Barišić.

Life
Waldemar Maximilian Nestor was born in Groß Strehlitz to Anton and Julija (née Hepner) Nestor. His family moved near Banja Luka in Austria-Hungary when his father got a job there as a state forester. Nestor continued his education at the Trappist Mariastern Abbey.
He was ordained a priest on 2 February 1917 as a member of the abbey where he served as a teacher in the abbey's elementary school and as a governor of the abbey's resources. 

In 1931 he left the Trappist order and joined the diocesan priests after which he was appointed parochial vicar in Ljubunčić. In 1936 he was transferred to Bosanski Petrovac where he was appointed parish priest. As the majority of Catholics of the parish had lived in Drvar, he moved the parish seat there.

Death

On 26 July 1941 he went with his parishioners on a pilgrimage to Saint Ann near Knin. On the way back to Drvar on 27 July, near Trubar, Serb rebels stopped the train and killed the group. Afterwards, the bodies were tossed into the Golubnjača pit.

Footnotes

1888 births
1941 deaths
20th-century Bosnia and Herzegovina Roman Catholic priests
Bosnia and Herzegovina people of German descent
People from Strzelce Opolskie
Drvar